Uranium pentabromide is an inorganic chemical compound with the formula .

Synthesis

Properties
Uranium pentabromide is a hygroscopic dark brown solid that decomposes in water and most organic solvents, the exceptions being acetonitrile or dichloromethane. The compound is rather unstable and difficult to purify, decomposing at  into its constituent elements. The crystal structure is the same as that of β-, which is triclinic and consists of  dimers.

Complexes
Stable complexes of the form  are known with such ligands as triphenylphosphine oxide and hexamethylphosphoramide, and are obtained by brominating  in the presence of the desired ligand. In addition, it is possible to obtain a hexabromouranate(V) salt by reacting  with a monovalent bromide in thionyl bromide:

References

Uranium(V) compounds
Bromides
Actinide halides